is a passenger railway station located in the city of  Iyo, Ehime Prefecture, Japan. It is operated by JR Shikoku and has the station number "U08".

Lines
Connections with other services are needed to travel further east of Matsuyama on the line.

In addition, the Uwakai limited express also stops at the station.

Layout
The station consists of two opposed side platforms serving two tracks. A station building serves as a waiting room. Access to the opposite platform is by means of a footbridge. The station is unstaffed but a kan'i itaku agent located outside the station sells some types of tickets.

Adjacent stations

History
Iyo-Nakayama Station was opened by Japanese National Railways (JNR) on 3 March 1986. With the privatization of JNR on 1 April 1987, control of the station passed to JR Shikoku.

Surrounding area
 Japan National Route 56

See also
 List of railway stations in Japan

References

External links
Station timetable

Railway stations in Ehime Prefecture
Railway stations in Japan opened in 1986
Iyo, Ehime